The 1921 Texas Longhorns football team represented the University of Texas at Austin in the 1921 college football season.  In their second year under head coach Berry Whitaker, the Longhorns compiled a 6–1–1 record, shut out six of eight opponents (including a scoreless tie with Texas A&M), and outscored all opponents by a collective total of 268 to 27. Before the upset by Vanderbilt, the 1921 squad was thought perhaps the best in Longhorns history.

Schedule

References

Texas
Texas Longhorns football seasons
Texas Longhorns football